The 2020 season was the New England Patriots' 51st in the National Football League, their 61st overall, and their 21st under head coach Bill Belichick.

It was the first season since 1999 without quarterback Tom Brady on the roster, as he signed with the Tampa Bay Buccaneers. Brady led the Patriots to nine Super Bowl appearances, winning six, and had been their primary starting quarterback from 2001 to 2019, and coincidentally, Brady would go on to win his first Super Bowl with his new team and his seventh win overall. The Patriots signed long-time Carolina Panthers quarterback and 2015 MVP Cam Newton on June 29, and named him the starting quarterback on September 3.

The Patriots attempted to win their 12th consecutive AFC East title and their first since 1997 without Tom Brady. However, they saw many key players opt out of the season due to COVID-19 concerns and battled numerous injuries throughout the season. They began the season 2–5, their worst record through 7 games since 2000. They failed to improve on their 12–4 record from the previous season following a Week 7 loss to the San Francisco 49ers and failed to match that record following a Week 8 loss to the division rival Buffalo Bills. Following a Sunday Night win by the Bills over the Steelers in week 14, the Patriots failed to win their division for the first time since 2008, and they were mathematically eliminated from playoff contention for the first time since 2008 with a Week 15 loss to the Dolphins, ending their winning season streak at 19. This leaves the record to the Dallas Cowboys at 20 consecutive winning seasons from 1966 to 1985. After their blowout loss to the Buffalo Bills in week 16, the New England Patriots finished the 2020 season with a losing record for the first time since 2000.

This was only the third time since 2000 the Patriots missed the playoffs and failed to win the division. With their 11-year streak of playoff appearances snapped, the Kansas City Chiefs now hold the league's longest playoff streak, making the playoffs every year since 2015. In addition, New England's streak of 10+ win seasons that dated back to their 2003 Super Bowl-winning season, which was an NFL record, also came to an end following a Week 14 loss to the Los Angeles Rams.

For the season, the Patriots adopted a modified version of their Color Rush jerseys as their primary home uniform while introducing a new road uniform for the first time since 2000.

Roster changes

Free agency

Unrestricted

Restricted

Exclusive-Rights

Signings

Releases/waivers

Retirements

Trades 
 March 18: the Patriots traded safety Duron Harmon and a 2020 seventh-round selection (No. 235 overall) to the Detroit Lions in exchange for the Lions' 2020 fifth-round selection (No. 172 overall).
 April 21: the Patriots traded tight end Rob Gronkowski and a 2020 seventh-round selection (No. 241 overall) to the Tampa Bay Buccaneers in exchange for the Buccaneers' fourth-round selection (No. 139 overall).
 August 9: the Patriots traded a conditional 2022 seventh-round selection to the Detroit Lions in exchange for cornerback Mike Jackson Sr.
 November 3: the Patriots traded a 2022 seventh-round selection to the Miami Dolphins in exchange for wide receiver Isaiah Ford.

Draft

Notes
 New England traded a 2020 first-round selection (No. 23 overall) to the Los Angeles Chargers in exchange for a 2020 second-round selection (No. 37 overall) and a 2020 third-round selection (No. 71 overall).
New England traded a 2020 second-round selection (No. 55 overall) to the Atlanta Falcons in exchange for wide receiver Mohamed Sanu.
New England acquired a 2020 second-round selection (No. 60 overall) and a 2020 fourth-round selection (No. 129 overall) in exchange for two 2020 third-round selections (No. 71 overall and No. 98 overall).
New England acquired a 2020 third-round selection (No. 91 overall) and a 2020 fifth-round selection (No. 159 overall) in exchange for a 2020 third-round selection (No. 100 overall), a 2020 fourth-round selection (No. 139 overall), and a 2020 fifth-round selection (No. 172 overall). 
New England acquired a 2020 third-round selection (No. 101 overall) in exchange for two 2020 fourth-round selections (No. 125 overall and No. 129 overall) and a 2021 sixth-round selection. 
 New England acquired a 2020 fourth-round selection (No. 125 overall) as part of a trade that sent their 2019 third- and sixth-round selections to the Chicago Bears.
New England acquired a 2020 fourth-round selection (No. 139 overall) as part of a trade that sent tight end Rob Gronkowski and a 2020 seventh-round selection (No. 241 overall) to the Tampa Bay Buccaneers.
New England traded a 2020 fourth-round selection (No. 129 overall) to the Baltimore Ravens in exchange for offensive lineman Jermaine Eluemunor and a 2020 sixth-round selection (No. 207 overall).
 New England traded a 2020 fifth-round selection (No. 168 overall) to the Philadelphia Eagles in exchange for a 2020 seventh-round selection (No. 235 overall) and defensive lineman Michael Bennett.
New England acquired a 2020 fifth-round selection (No. 172 overall) as a part of a trade that sent safety Duron Harmon and a 2020 seventh-round selection (No. 235 overall) to the Detroit Lions.
New England acquired a 2020 sixth-round selection (No. 182 overall) as part of a trade that sent two 2020 sixth-round selections (No. 212 overall and No. 213 overall) to the Indianapolis Colts. 
 New England acquired a 2020 sixth-round selection (No. 195 overall) as part of a trade that sent cornerback Duke Dawson and a 2020 seventh-round selection (No. 237 overall) to the Denver Broncos.
New England traded a 2020 sixth-round selection (No. 202 overall) to the Arizona Cardinals in exchange for offensive tackle Korey Cunningham.
New England acquired a 2020 sixth-round selection (No. 204 overall) as part of a trade that sent cornerback Keion Crossen to the Houston Texans.
New England traded a 2020 sixth-round selection (No. 207 overall) to the Buffalo Bills in exchange for center Russell Bodine.
New England acquired a 2020 seventh-round selection (No. 230 overall) as part of a trade that sent safety Jordan Richards to the Atlanta Falcons.
New England acquired a 2020 seventh-round selection (No. 241 overall) as part of a trade that sent tight end Jacob Hollister to the Seattle Seahawks. As the result of the negative differential of free agent signings and departures that the Patriots experienced during the first wave of the 2019 free agency period, the team received the league-maximum four compensatory selections for the 2020 draft. Free agent transactions that occurred after May 7, 2019 did not factor into the team's formula for determining compensatory selections.

Undrafted free agents

Staff

Final roster

Preseason
The Patriots' preseason schedule was announced on May 7, but was later cancelled due to the COVID-19 pandemic.

Regular season

Schedule
The Patriots' 2020 schedule was announced on May 7.

Note: Intra-division opponents are in bold text.

Game summaries

Week 1: vs. Miami Dolphins

This was the Patriots' first game without longtime quarterback Tom Brady since October 2, 2016, and their first without Brady on the roster since January 2, 2000. Nonetheless, new starting quarterback Cam Newton performed admirably, finishing with a 79% completion percentage and leading a rush-heavy offensive attack with 75 rushing yards and 2 touchdowns on the ground, as the Patriots finished with 217 rushing yards overall. With the win, New England opened the season at 1–0.

Week 2: at Seattle Seahawks

A competitive matchup versus the Seahawks on Sunday Night Football saw Seattle pull away during the third quarter, though the Patriots offense kept pace in the fourth quarter. A potential game-winning drive by the Patriots was snuffed out when Cam Newton, who passed for nearly 400 yards, was stuffed short of the goal line on a quarterback keeper in the final seconds of the game. This was New England's third loss in four career meetings with former Patriots head coach Pete Carroll. It was also Newton's sixth loss in eight career games against the Seahawks.

Week 3: vs. Las Vegas Raiders

Running back Rex Burkhead scored three touchdowns in a blowout win over the previously undefeated Raiders; the game was Belichick's 275th career win with the Patriots.

Week 4: at Kansas City Chiefs

The game was postponed to Monday night after Cam Newton tested positive for COVID-19. With Newton out, backup quarterback Brian Hoyer made the start for the Patriots. A low-scoring defensive affair in the first half saw the New England defense shut down Super Bowl MVP Patrick Mahomes for much of the half, though the Patriots offense was likewise ineffective, with Hoyer taking a sack on the last play of the first half that prevented a potential game-tying field goal. Mahomes and the Chiefs offense came to life late in the third quarter, scoring two touchdowns on back-to-back drives as Hoyer was benched for Jarrett Stidham, who threw his first career touchdown but also two interceptions, including a pick-six to Tyrann Mathieu that all but sealed the game and dropped New England to 2–2.

Week 6: vs. Denver Broncos

Despite scoring the game's only touchdown, this was the Patriots' first home loss to Denver in 14 years as they fell below .500, the first time they failed to be above .500 following Week 6 since 2002. In addition, it was the first time the Patriots lost without giving up a touchdown in the Bill Belichick era.

Week 7: vs. San Francisco 49ers

49ers quarterback Jimmy Garoppolo made his first return to New England since the Patriots traded him to the 49ers in October 2017. Garoppolo played for the Patriots from 2014 to 2017 and was part of their 2014 and 2016 Super Bowl-winning teams. This was the Patriots' worst home loss in the Belichick era and their worst loss since their 2003 season opener versus the Buffalo Bills, where they were shut out 31–0. It was also the Patriots' first time losing three games in a row since 2002.

Week 8: at Buffalo Bills

A game that featured strong rushing performances by both teams was played down to the wire. As the Patriots were driving down the field for a score to win or tie the game down 24–21 in the last two minutes, Bills defensive tackle Justin Zimmer forced Cam Newton to fumble at the Buffalo 14-yard line, sealing the loss for New England. This was the Patriots' first loss to the Bills in four years; also their first road loss to them since the Pats' 2011 AFC Championship season. The Patriots also began the season 2–5 for the first time since 2000.

Week 9: at New York Jets

Against the winless Jets, the Patriots fell behind 20–10 by halftime, but mounted a comeback, limiting the Jets to just four plays in the fourth quarter. Nick Folk's game-winning 51 yard field goal as time expired ended the Patriots' four-game losing streak, also giving them their first road win this season. New England improved to 3–5 with the win and began 3-5 for the first time since 1994.

Week 10: vs. Baltimore Ravens

In the rain, the Patriots were able to sneak out a 23–17 win against the previously 6-2 Ravens. With the win, the Patriots improved to 4–5, and this was their first winning streak this season. They also began 4-5 for the first time since 1988.

Week 11: at Houston Texans

Cam Newton's last-second Hail Mary was not enough as the Patriots suffered their second straight loss to the Texans. Their two-game win streak ended as they fell to 4–6, their first 4–6 start since 1994. They also lost 6 games in a season for the first time since 2009.

Week 12: vs. Arizona Cardinals

Nick Folk's last-second 50-yard field goal improved the Patriots to a 5–6 start for the first time since 1994 and increased their home win streak to two games.

Week 13: at Los Angeles Chargers

With the blowout win, the Patriots improve to 6-6 and were now at an even .500. This was only their second road win this season.

Week 14: at Los Angeles Rams

With the loss, the Patriots dropped below .500 again as they fell to 6–7, losing at least 7 games for the first time since 2002 and beginning 6-7 for the first time since 1987. This was also the Patriots' first loss to the Rams since their 2001 Super Bowl-winning season.

Despite 4 red zone trips, the Patriots’ only score came from a Nick Folk field goal; their three points scored were the lowest the Patriots have scored in a game since a 2016 Week 4 shutout against the Buffalo Bills. This was also their fewest points scored in a game in which their first-string quarterback made a start, since a 2006 shutout loss against the Miami Dolphins (Brady was serving his four-game suspension in that 2016 loss against the Bills).

In addition, with the Bills beating the Steelers later on NBC Sunday Night Football, the Patriots failed to win the AFC East for the first time since 2008.

Week 15: at Miami Dolphins

With the loss, the Patriots were eliminated from the playoffs for the first time since 2008 and were ensured a non-winning season for the first time since 2000. During the 2nd quarter, cornerback and reigning Defensive Player of the Year Stephon Gilmore suffered a partially torn quad that would cause him to miss the remainder of the season. Quarterback Cam Newton also lost to the Dolphins for the first time in his 9-year career. It was the team's first 6–8 start since 1971. They also finished 2-6 on the road.

Week 16: vs. Buffalo Bills

With the loss, the Patriots suffer their first losing record since 2000, and have been swept by the Bills for the first time since 1999 as well as for the first time under Bill Belichick's tenure. This is also the first time since 2000 a division rival swept New England. The 29 point home loss is the worst in the Bill Belichick era, and the 2nd worst loss overall (Buffalo won 31–0 in Week 1 of the 2003 season in then-Ralph Wilson Stadium).

Week 17: vs. New York Jets

The Patriots completed their fifth straight season-sweep of the Jets, and won 10 in a row in the rivalry. New England also avoided a double digit loss season, something that has not happened since 2000.

Standings

Division

Conference

Notes

References

External links
 

New England Patriots
New England Patriots seasons
New England Patriots
Sports competitions in Foxborough, Massachusetts